Major-General William Euan Buchanan Loudon CBE (born 12 March 1956) is a former British Army officer who commanded 2nd Division.

Military career
Loudon was commissioned into the Royal Highland Fusiliers in 1975 and later commanded the 1st Battalion of his regiment. In 1991 he served in the Gulf War as the Chief of Staff of 7th Armoured Brigade (Desert Rats). He was appointed an officer of the Order of the British Empire (OBE) for his operational service in the Gulf War. He was appointed Commander of 39th Infantry Brigade in 1999, Chief of Staff at HQ Northern Ireland in 2001 and General Officer Commanding 2nd Division and Governor of Edinburgh Castle in 2004 before he retired in early 2007.

Business career

He became Chief Executive and Producer of the Royal Edinburgh Military Tattoo in 2007 and then Chief Executive of the St Andrews Links Trust in 2011. He was appointed Chairman of the St Andrews Links Trust in 2012 and the following year he became Chairman of Tom Morris International. He retired from the St Andrews Links Trust in December 2021.

Operational Awards
Commander of the Order of the British Empire (CBE) - 2004 (OBE - 1991)
 Queen's Commendation for Valuable Service - 2002

References

1956 births
Living people
British Army major generals
Commanders of the Order of the British Empire
Recipients of the Commendation for Valuable Service
British Army personnel of the Gulf War
Royal Highland Fusiliers officers
Scottish military personnel